The 2020–21 Grenoble Foot 38 season was the club's 129th season in existence and its third consecutive season in the second flight of French football. In addition to the domestic league, Grenoble participated in this season's edition of the Coupe de France. The season covered the period from 1 July 2020 to 30 June 2021.

Players

First-team squad

Out on loan

Pre-season and friendlies

Competitions

Overview

Ligue 2

League table

Results summary

Results by round

Matches
The league fixtures were announced on 9 July 2020.

Coupe de France

References

External links

Grenoble Foot 38 seasons
Grenoble Foot 38